Of the Wand & the Moon (stylized as :Of the Wand & the Moon:) is the neofolk/experimental project of Danish musician Kim Larsen and various guest contributors.

Overview
Larsen was originally a member of the gothic/doom metal band Saturnus, but left due to personal disputes. Following this, he began the neofolk project :Of the Wand & the Moon:, as he was a longtime fan of the genre. 

Larsen lists among his musical influences the neofolk artists Death in June, Blood Axis, Current 93, Sol Invictus, Fire and Ice, Der Blutharsch, and Nature and Organisation. He credits Thunder Perfect Mind by Current 93 with making him want to be a neofolk artist, and calls Death in June's Rose Clouds of Holocaust the albums that "means the most" to him. Thematically, he is influenced by runes, Aleister Crowley, Norse mythology, esoterica, and paganism. He once described his music as "loner folk".

In 1999, the debut :Of the Wand & the Moon: album was released, titled Nighttime Nightrhymes.

2001 saw the release of a second :Of the Wand & the Moon: release titled :Emptiness:Emptiness:Emptiness:.

After the release of a split album with Sol Invictus and a few vinyl singles, a collection of b-sides, taken from the :Emptiness:Emptiness:Emptiness: sessions, titled Lucifer, was released in 2003.

A third album, Sonnenheim, was released in 2005. Here, the music bears a strong resemblance to that of neofolk pioneers Death in June.

After a 6-year silence, a fourth album, The Lone Descent, was released in 2011. It features more contemporary influences and a richer production. The album was received with great critical acclaim and is considered a neofolk masterpiece.

10 years later, in 2021, a fifth album entitled Your Love Can't Hold This Wreath of Sorrow was released. It follows in a similar vein to that of The Lone Descent, but features even greater experimentation with other genres such as post-punk and electronica.

Discography

Albums and EPs

References

External links

Official
Official :Of The Wand & The Moon: Site
Official :Of The Wand & The Moon: Myspace
Official :Of The Wand & The Moon: Facebook

Reviews
Review of "The Lone Descent" on Heathen Harvest
Review of "Lucifer" on Sputnik Music

Danish folk music groups
Neofolk music groups